Éloi Tassin (Vay, 6 June 1912 — Sables d'Olonne, 17 August 1977) was a French professional road bicycle racer. Tassin won a stage in the 1939 Tour de France, and another stage in the 1947 Tour de France.

Allée Éloi Tassin in Nantes is named after him. A Éloi Tassin day was held in his honour at Vay on the 100th anniversary of his birth.

Major results

1939
Circuit de l'Indre
Tour de France:
Winner stage 2B
1945
GP Ouest-France
 national road race championship
Manche-Océan
Grand Prix des Nations
1947
Tour de France:
Winner stage 17
1948
GP Ouest-France

References

External links 

Official Tour de France results for Eloi Tassin

French male cyclists
1912 births
1977 deaths
French Tour de France stage winners
Cyclists from Loire-Atlantique